Dubensky District or Dubyonsky District may refer to:
Dubensky District, Russia, name of several districts in Russia
Dubno Raion (Dubenskyi raion), a district of Rivne Oblast, Ukraine

District name disambiguation pages